Stephan Eicher (born 17 August 1960) is a Swiss singer. He sings in a variety of languages, including French, German, English, Italian, Swiss German and Romansh, sometimes using different languages in the same song.

Eicher's success started in German-speaking countries in the 1980s when, as part of the band , he had a hit single, .

Life 

Stephan Eicher was born in the rural municipality of Münchenbuchsee not far from Bern.

He released his first single , together with his brother Martin, on the album  in 1980. He became interested in French songs by Jacques Dutronc, Georges Brassens and Serge Gainsbourg, and these influences led to the album . This album is also inspired by the American singers he listened to during his youth, such as Patti Smith, Johnny Cash and Bob Dylan.

His two subsequent albums began to establish his reputation. The album, I Tell This Night, and the single Two People in a Room were released in 1985. It peaked on the Swiss charts at number ten and stayed twelve weeks. Two years later, the album Silence reached number three and was in the Swiss Top 10 for fourteen weeks. Both albums were created by Stephan Eicher almost single-handedly.

1989's My Place went in a different direction. The French lyrics were written by his friend, author Philippe Djian. His largest commercial success came in 1991 with the album , which spent five weeks at number one in Switzerland and 46 weeks on the charts in total. The song  was also number two in France. His subsequent albums regularly reached the top five on the Swiss album charts.

Following a world tour, which included concerts in Africa, he produced his first live album in 1994.

Since 1989, his song lyrics have been written by Djian.

In 2001, Eicher released his first greatest hits compilation album entitled Hotel*s. For many years, the hotel Hess on the Swiss Engelberg was his second home. Martin Hess, the hotelier couple's son, became his close friend and producer. At the hotel, the albums  and  developed. Eicher selected the title Hotel*s as homage to this grand hotel, which was torn down in the same year. For the title selection for the album, he let the fans co-ordinate with the official homepage.

Cover versions of his songs 
 Singer Sian Charia recorded a cover version of Eicher's  (translated into Khmer) in Phnom Penh in 1995.

 German metal band Vanden Plas covered  on their  EP in 1996.

 His song  has been remixed by Flood.

 Experimental electronic music group Cabaret Voltaire recorded a cover version of Eicher's No Escape. Originally written by The Seeds

 Australian Brigitte Handley & The Dark Shadows recorded  for their 2014 album Autumn Still.

Other participations 
 Eicher has recorded a cover version of the jazz standard My Funny Valentine.
 In the past 25 years, Stephan Eicher has collaborated with numerous musicians. He also participates in many large European Festivals. I Muvrini (Corsica), Ismael Lo (Senegal), Axelle Red (Belgium), and Texas (UK) have all been guests on his tours.
 Eicher also produces Swiss musician Tinu Heiniger.

Discography 

Singles
  (1991)
  (1991)
  (1992)
  (1992)

With 
  (1978)
  (1980)

Solo
 Noise Boys (1980)
 Souvenir (1982)
  (1983)
 I Tell This Night (1985)
 Silence (1987)
 My Place (1989)
  (1991)
  (1993)
  (1994)
  (1996)
  (1999)
 Hotel*s (2001)
 Taxi Europa (2003)
 Tour Taxi Europa (2004)
 Eldorado (2007)
  (2012)
 Song Book (2017)
  with Traktorkestar (2019)
 Homeless Songs (2019)

References

External links 

 
 Unofficial website dedicated to Stephan Eicher

1960 births
Living people
People from Bern-Mittelland District
Swiss singer-songwriters
English-language singers from Switzerland
French-language singers of Switzerland
German-language singers of Switzerland
Italian-language singers of Switzerland
Romansh-language singers
21st-century Swiss male singers
20th-century Swiss male singers
Ecole d'Humanité alumni